ODM may refer to:

Computing
 .odm, Overdrive Media file
 IBM Operational Decision Management, IBM's Business Rule Management System (BRMS)
 Object Data Manager, a component of the AIX operating system used to store configuration information
 Object Data Modelling, similar to Object-role modeling (ORM)
 Operational Data Model, an XML-based data model to describe and collect clinical trial data
 Ontology Definition MetaModel, an Object Management Group specification
 Oracle Data Mining, an optional extra for Oracle Database
 Oracle Directory Manager, part of Oracle Internet Directory, a tool for administering LDAP servers

Other uses
 Odm., the abbreviation for the orchid genus Odontoglossum
 Office of Defense Mobilization, a United States government agency, active from 1950 to 1958 
 Orange Democratic Movement, a Kenyan political party
 Original design manufacturer, a company that produces a product to be sold under another company's brand